The Embassy of Peru in London is the diplomatic mission of Peru in the United Kingdom. The Embassy is located in 15 Buckingham Gate, London, SW1E 6LB.

The Residence of the Ambassador is located in 34 Porchester Terrace, near Kensington Palace. The Italianate Victorian house was once the residence of Queen Victoria Eugenie of Spain, who rented the property to he Peruvian Government since 1948.

Peru also maintains a Defence Attaché's Office.

Gallery

References

External links
Official site

Peru
London
Peru–United Kingdom relations
Buildings and structures in the Royal Borough of Kensington and Chelsea
Knightsbridge